Pseudophilautus schmarda is a species of frog in the family Rhacophoridae. It is endemic to the central hills of Sri Lanka and is known from the Peak Wilderness Sanctuary, Agra Bopath, Horton Plains, and Pedro. The specific name schmarda honours Ludwig Karl Schmarda, an Austrian physician, naturalist, and traveler. Common names Sri Lanka bug-eyed frog and Schmarda's shrub frog have been coined for it.

Description
Adult males measure  and adult females, based on only two specimens,  in snout–vent length. The body is stout. The snout is obtusely pointed. The tympanum is visible and the supratympanic fold is prominent. The fingers have lateral dermal fringes and only rudimentary webbing, whereas the toes are medially webbed. Skin of the upper side is rough with glandular folds, glandular warts, and horn-like spinules. The upper parts are dark green and red-brown; the flanks grade from yellow through dark brown to light brown. The chest and abdomen are yellow and bear bright-yellow spots.

Habitat and conservation
The eggs are deposited in a deep hole that the female excavates in the forest floor.

Pseudophilautus schmarda  is a common frog. While much of its range lies within protected areas, habitat deterioration is taking place because of illegal firewood collection, clear-cutting for timber, and conversion to agricultural land such as tea plantations. Additional potential threats are forest fires and agro-chemical pollution.

References

schmarda
Frogs of Sri Lanka
Endemic fauna of Sri Lanka
Amphibians described in 1854
Taxa named by Edward Frederick Kelaart
Taxonomy articles created by Polbot